Verilus is a genus of fish in the family Acropomatidae found in the Atlantic.

Species
There are currently 3 recognized species in this genus:
 Verilus pseudomicrolepis (Schultz, 1940)
 Verilus sordidus Poey, 1860
 Verilus starnesi Yamanoue, 2016

Taxonomy
Some authorities merge this genus with Neoscombrops and Apogonops but Fishbase treats them as separate genera.

References

 
Acropomatidae
Fish described in 1860
Marine fish genera
Taxa named by Felipe Poey